Vincenzo "Enzo" Daniele Scifo (born 19 February 1966) is a retired Belgian football midfielder. He has also managed the Belgium national under-21 football team and several Belgian club sides. He played for clubs in Belgium, France and Italy, where he won several domestic titles. At international level, he was a member of the Belgium national team, for which he appeared in four FIFA World Cups, being one of three Belgian players ever to do so.

Early life 
Scifo was born in La Louvière, Wallonia, to Italian parents from Sicily. He proved himself a highly promising talent in youth football and was nicknamed "Little Pelé" at his local team, where he scored 432 goals in only four seasons as a junior. Scifo joined his local club R.A.A. Louviéroise as a seven-year-old in 1973. He transferred to what used to be Belgium's most successful club, R.S.C. Anderlecht, in 1982.

Club career 
Scifo made his first team debut with R.S.C. Anderlecht in 1983, at the age of 17. After winning three Belgian First Division championships with the club, and helping the team to the 1984 UEFA Cup Final, only to lose out to Tottenham on penalties, Scifo earned a reputation as one of the most promising young stars of his generation, and moved to Italian club Internazionale in 1987 for a fee of 7.5 billion Lire. After an unsuccessful spell in Milan, which saw him manage only four league goals in 28 appearances, he moved to French club Bordeaux in 1988 where he again disappointed, and faced injuries and conflict with senior squad members. His career was revived by a successful move to Auxerre in 1989, at the age of 23, under manager Guy Roux, which led to a return to Italy with Torino in 1991; his second spell in Serie A was more successful, as he reached the 1992 UEFA Cup Final in his first season with Torino, and won the Coppa Italia the following season. Scifo then moved to AS Monaco in 1993, where he endured a similar level of success and won the French championship in 1997. He returned to Anderlecht later that year and won his fourth Belgian league title in the 1999–2000 season. He joined Charleroi in 2000, but retired later in the same season, at the age of 36, after being diagnosed with chronic arthritis. In total, Scifo scored 121 league goals in 478 official matches.

International career 
Scifo made his senior international debut on 6 June 1984 for Belgium, in a 2–2 friendly draw against Hungary. In Belgium's opening group match of UEFA Euro 1984, on 13 June, he attracted much publicity when he helped his team to a 2–0 victory over Yugoslavia; at the age of 18 years and 115 days, he was the youngest player ever to appear in the finals at the time. Scifo featured in all three of Belgium's group matches in the tournament, as they placed third in their group and suffered a first round elimination.

He appeared for Belgium in the 1986, 1990, 1994, and 1998 World Cups, playing sixteen games in total; he is one of only 14 players to have participated in four World Cups, and one of only three Belgian players ever to do so. Scifo helped his nation to the semi-finals of the 1986 edition of the tournament in Mexico, playing in all seven of his team's matches and scoring two goals as Belgium finished the tournament in fourth place; he was named the best young player of the tournament for his performances throughout the competition. In the 1990 edition of the tournament, held in Italy, Scifo scored a notable goal from long range in Belgium's 3-1 first round victory over Uruguay, on 17 June, held in Verona; the goal was later elected as the tenth greatest FIFA World Cup goal of the Century in a 2002 poll, with 2,935 votes. Belgium were eventually eliminated in the second round against England; four years later, at U.S.A. '94, the Belgian side were once again eliminated in the second round. Scifo retired from international football after Belgium's first round elimination in the 1998 World Cup held in France; in total he gained eighty-four international caps and scored eighteen goals.

Style of play 
A highly creative midfielder with an eye for goal, Scifo was a classic number 10 playmaker who usually played as an attacking midfielder behind the strikers; he was also capable of playing as a central midfielder, where he functioned as a deep-lying playmaker, or as a wide midfielder along the right flank. Considered one of Belgium's greatest ever players, his primary traits as a footballer were his excellent vision, tactical intelligence, and technical skills, which allowed him to orchestrate his team's attacking moves from midfield; he was also highly regarded for his balance on the ball, and his ability to dribble with his head up, as well as his accurate shooting and passing ability with his right foot, which enabled him both to score goals or create chances for his teammates. However, despite his talent, he was also criticised by his managers at times for his poor defensive work-rate off the ball, his introverted character, and for being selfish and inefficient at times, in particular in his youth, as he attempted too many individual dribbling runs, rather than looking to provide a simpler pass to an open teammate. Throughout his career, his unique playing style drew comparisons with Gianni Rivera, Giancarlo Antognoni, and his idol Michel Platini.

After retirement 
Scifo tried his hand at coaching with R. Charleroi S.C., joining them for the 2000–01 season. Indifferent results led to his resignation in June 2002. He later coached Tubize between 2004 and 2006, and later became head trainer of R.E. Mouscron, another Belgian League team, in 2007. On 6 June 2009, Scifo quit Mouscron due to the club's difficult financial situation.

In May 2006, he was part of the historic first European Selection, led by former England manager Terry Venables and Josep Mª Fusté which had its début in Eindhoven in the first EFPA Match.

Scifo returned to club football with Mons between 2012 and 2013. Between 2015 and 2016, he served as the manager of the Belgium U21 national team.

Career statistics

Club

International 

Scores and results list Belgium's goal tally first, score column indicates score after each Scifo goal.

Honours 
Anderlecht
 Belgian First Division: 1984–85, 1985–86, 1986–87, 1999–2000
 Belgian Supercup: 1985
 Belgian League Cup: 2000
 UEFA Cup: runners-up 1983–84
 Jules Pappaert Cup: 1983, 1985, 2000
 Bruges Matins: 1985
 Belgian Sports Team of the Year: 2000

Monaco
 Division 1: 1996–97

Torino
 Coppa Italia: 1992–93
 UEFA Cup: runners-up 1991–92

Belgium
 FIFA World Cup: fourth place 1986

Individual

 Belgian Golden Shoe: 1984
 Ballon d'Or nominations: 1984, 1990, 1992, 1993
 4 FIFA World Cup participations: 1986, 1990, 1994, 1998
 FIFA World Cup Best Young Player: 1986
 FIFA World Cup All-Star Team: 1990
 La Gazzetta dello Sport + Associated Press + Match World Cup All-Star Team: 1990
 French Division 1 Foreign Player of the Year: 1990
 Belgian Professional Footballer of the Year: 1990–91
 Platina 11 (Best Team in 50 Years Golden Shoe Winners): 2003
 The Best Golden Shoe Team Ever: 2011
 RBFA 125 Years Icons Team: 2020
 IFFHS All Time Belgium Dream Team: 2021

References

External links
 

1966 births
Living people
Belgian footballers
Belgian expatriate footballers
R.A.A. Louviéroise players
R.S.C. Anderlecht players
Inter Milan players
Expatriate footballers in Italy
AJ Auxerre players
Expatriate footballers in France
Torino F.C. players
Belgian Pro League players
Serie A players
Ligue 1 players
AS Monaco FC players
Expatriate footballers in Monaco
Belgian football managers
R. Charleroi S.C. managers
R.A.E.C. Mons managers
Belgium international footballers
UEFA Euro 1984 players
1986 FIFA World Cup players
1990 FIFA World Cup players
1994 FIFA World Cup players
1998 FIFA World Cup players
Royal Excel Mouscron managers
Belgian people of Italian descent
Belgian people of Sicilian descent
Belgian expatriate sportspeople in Italy
Belgian expatriate sportspeople in France
Belgian expatriate sportspeople in Monaco
People from La Louvière
Association football midfielders
Belgian First Division B managers
Footballers from Hainaut (province)